Marco Perchtold (born 21 September 1988) is an Austrian professional footballer who plays as a defensive midfielder for Grazer AK.

Honours
Pasching
Austrian Cup: 2012–13

References

External links

 Marco Perchtold Interview

Austrian footballers
Austrian Football Bundesliga players
1988 births
Living people
Grazer AK players
SC Wiener Neustadt players
FC Gratkorn players
FC Juniors OÖ players
SV Grödig players
Kapfenberger SV players
SKN St. Pölten players
Association football midfielders